Vandervelde is a Brussels Metro station on line 1 (formerly the eastern branch of line 1B). It is named after the /, which it serves. It is located in the municipality of Woluwe-Saint-Lambert/Sint-Lambrechts-Woluwe, in the eastern part of Brussels, Belgium, and was opened on 7 May 1982.

The murals in the metro station are by the Belgian artist Paul De Gobert.

Brussels metro stations
Railway stations opened in 1982
Woluwe-Saint-Lambert
1982 establishments in Belgium